Stansbury High School is a public four-year high school in the western United States, located in Stansbury Park, Utah. Established in 2009 as part of the Tooele County School District. Stansbury High is currently in the Utah High School Activities Association (UHSAA) Class 5A Region VII and its mascot is a Stallion. As of the 2018–2019 school year, Stansbury High has 1,849 students enrolled and 76 teachers, with a student-to-teacher ratio of approximately 24:1. Stansbury High School teaches the 9th through the 12th grades.

References 

Schools in Tooele County, Utah
Public high schools in Utah
Educational institutions established in 2009
2009 establishments in Utah